Kevin Levoin Broadus (born January 30, 1964) is an American college basketball coach and currently the head coach at Morgan State. He is the former head coach at Binghamton University, where he resigned after an NCAA Investigation.

Playing career
Broadus began playing collegiately at Grambling State University, but transferred after his first season to Bowie State University.  He played for Bowie State from 1983 to 1986, earning conference all-rookie honors in the 1984 season, and leading his team in scoring as a captain during his senior year.  Broadus graduated from Bowie State in 1990 with a degree in business administration.

Coaching career
After a playing career at Bowie State, Broadus stayed on with his alma mater as an assistant coach until 1993, when he joined the University of District of Columbia coaching staff. In 1997, he'd become an assistant at American, which was followed by assistant coaching stops in his hometown Washington, D.C. at both George Washington and  Georgetown University under John Thompson III.  Broadus helped in the rebuilding of the Hoya program, culminating in a trip to the 2007 Final Four. After the 2007 season, he was named the head coach at Binghamton, where he guided the team to its first ever NCAA Tournament appearance in 2009 before being dismissed in light of an investigation into the Bearcat program that offseason.

After Binghamton, Broadus rejoined the staff at Georgetown in 2011. In 2017, Broadus was named an assistant coach on Mark Turgeon's staff at Maryland. On May 1, 2019, Broadus was named the 16th head coach in Morgan State history, replacing Todd Bozeman.

Broadus at Binghamton

In two short seasons, Kevin Broadus vaulted Binghamton's basketball program to the top of the America East Conference.  After directing a three-game improvement in his first season in 2007–08, Broadus's Bearcats completed a remarkable season in 2008–09.  They won a school record-tying 23 games and a share of the America East regular season title. After defeating opponents from the Big East, Conference USA and MAAC in the non-conference schedule, Binghamton stormed through the America East slate at a 13–3 clip, capping an undefeated February with a title-clinching home court win in front of a sellout 5,342 fans at the Events Center. They lost to Duke in the first round of the NCAA Tournament—a game that was seen by millions of basketball fans across the country as CBS's highlighted late game on March 19.

In September 2009, Broadus dismissed six players from the team for undisclosed team rules violations, later revealed to involve various criminal actions. Soon after, Joel Thirer, Binghamton's athletic director and the man who hired Broadus, was reassigned to a position outside the athletic department. On October 6, 2009, Broadus committed an NCAA violation by communicating with high school players during a no-contact period. On October 14, Broadus was placed on paid administrative leave—effectively a suspension with pay—pending a full investigation of operations into the men's basketball program.  Assistant Mark Macon was named interim coach.

The Bearcats started the 2009–10 season with only seven scholarship players, an interim coach, and an interim athletic director. Investigation into the actions of Broadus and the athletic department went past the university level and was being handled by the chancellor of the SUNY system, Nancy Zimpher.

In March, Zimpher announced that Broadus would not return as coach.  However, a permanent replacement would not be hired until the school hired a permanent president and athletic director.

The NCAA completed its investigation in October.  It found that assistant coach Mark Hsu had committed secondary violations by providing transportation to players.  However, due to a lack of cooperation from people involved in the case, the NCAA was unable to determine whether major violations occurred.  Shortly afterward, Broadus was reassigned to another position in the athletic department.

On October 29, Broadus announced he was filing a federal discrimination lawsuit against Binghamton and SUNY.  Hours later, the three parties reached a settlement in which Broadus would resign and take a $1.2 million buyout in return for dropping all legal action against BU or SUNY.

Head coaching record

References

1964 births
Living people
American men's basketball coaches
American men's basketball players
American Eagles men's basketball coaches
Basketball coaches from Washington, D.C.
Basketball players from Washington, D.C.
Binghamton Bearcats men's basketball coaches
Bowie State Bulldogs men's basketball coaches
Bowie State Bulldogs men's basketball players
College men's basketball head coaches in the United States
George Washington Colonials men's basketball coaches
Georgetown Hoyas men's basketball coaches
Grambling State Tigers men's basketball players
Maryland Terrapins men's basketball coaches
Morgan State Bears men's basketball coaches
UDC Firebirds men's basketball coaches